Charles Gerard Ford, is the  director and chief executive of Advantage Northern Ireland Limited, Newtownabbey, Northern Ireland. In 2009, he was awarded the Queen's Award for Enterprise Promotion - the  only honorary awardee that year.

References

Queen's Award for Enterprise Promotion (2009)
British businesspeople
Living people
Queen's Award for Enterprise Promotion (honorary)
Year of birth missing (living people)